Major General Nuraddin Sadig oglu Sadigov (1935–2009) also known as Nuraddin Sadikhov, was the Chief of the General Staff of the Azerbaijani Armed Forces, Deputy Minister of Defense and National Advisor on Military Issues.

Early life
Sadigov was born in Julfa Rayon, Nakhchivan exclave of Azerbaijan Republic. He graduated from Schors Lviv Combined Arms Command School and the Frunze Military Academy. Starting from December 1991, he served in Azerbaijani Armed Forces.

Career
On September 4, 1992 President of Azerbaijan Abulfaz Elchibey appointed Sadigov Chief of General Staff of Azerbaijani Armed Forces and promoted him to Major General. He served in the position until June 17, 1993 when Deputy Minister of Defense Safar Abiyev assumed the responsibilities of the minister and was appointed the Chief of Staff.
On February 3, 1999 President Heydar Aliyev relieved Sadigov from his duties of National Advisor on Military Issues.
Sadigov is credited with having led several successful operations from Kalbajar and Qubadli in the direction of Lachin in September and October 1992 during First Nagorno-Karabakh War. In 2007, Sadigov resigned from the military due to his age. He died on December 22, 2009. 
A school in Alakol village in Tovuz Rayon was named after Sadigov.

See also
Azerbaijani Army
Ministers of Defense of Azerbaijan Republic
Safar Abiyev

References

Azerbaijani generals
Azerbaijani military personnel of the Nagorno-Karabakh War
Ministers of Defense of Azerbaijan
1935 births
2009 deaths
People from the Nakhchivan Autonomous Republic
Chiefs of General Staff of Azerbaijani Armed Forces
Frunze Military Academy alumni